Knight Michiel Reiniersz Pauw (born 29 March 1590 – died 20th, buried 24 March 1640 at Nieuwe Kerk, Amsterdam was a director of the Dutch West India Company (WIC) between 1621-1636.

He grew up in Warmoesstraat in an influential Calvinist merchant family and studied law in Leiden. In 1615 Michael married Hillegonda Spiegel; in 1631 they lived at Singel 200. His brother Adriaan Pauw (1585 - February 21, 1653 ) was Grand Pensionary of Holland from 1631 to 1636 and from 1651 to 1653, and signatory of the Peace of Münster (1648) for which he was instrumental as ambassador for Holland. They had four brothers: Cornelis, Reynier, Pieter and Jacob. Their father, Reynier Pauw (1564–1636) was a merchant in grain and timber, one of the founders of the Dutch East India Company and the Dutch West India Company, several times mayor of Amsterdam.

West India Company
The WIC was founded in 1621 to exploit trade in the Western Hemisphere, and by 1625 had established a colony at Fort Amsterdam (Lower Manhattan) and Fort Orange. In the hope of encouraging settlement the company, in 1629, started to offer vast land grants and the feudal title of patroon. under the auspices of the Charter of Freedoms and Exemptions. In 1630, Pauw purchased two tracts from the Lenape at Hopoghan Hackingh (Hoboken) and at Ashasimus (Harsimus), covering the entire peninsula between the Hudson River and Hackensack River now known as Hudson County, New Jersey, as well as a third purchase of Staten Eylandt (Staten Island), now part of New York City. The patroonship was given the Latinized form of his surname (which means "peacock"), Pavonia. It is said it was sold to him by the Manhattans after they had retreated there after the sale of their home island to Peter Minuit some years before. Initially, a small hut and ferry landing were built at Arresick, called Powles Hoek (Paulus Hook), but Pauw failed to fulfill the other conditions set forth by the company (which included populating the area with at least fifty adults), and was later required to sell his interests back to it.
In 1634 he collaborated with Kiliaen van Rensselaer and Wouter van Twiller in sending cattle (horses and cows) in the next six years.

The name Pavonia remains as an avenue and library branch in contemporary Jersey City. There is also a Pavonia Court in Bayonne and Pavonia Avenue in Kearny. Erie Railroad's Hudson waterfront terminus was called Pavonia Terminal located nearby PATH rapid transit system's station once called Pavonia. Saint Peter's College, located on land that was part of the patroonship, has as its mascot a peacock.

Pavonia was not the only American territory that would bear his name.
First described by Amerigo Vespucci, who traveled with a Portuguese expedition of Gonçalo Coelho to Brazil in the year 1503, the Fernando de Noronha Archipelago was invaded by the English, and from 1556 until 1612, was held by the French. In 1628, it was occupied by the Dutch, who were displaced two years later by a Spanish-Portuguese military expedition led by Rui Calaza Borges. The Dutch occupied the island once again in 1635, making it a hospital for their troops who occupied Northeastern Brazil (the Brazilian coast between Rio São Francisco and Maranhão). The island became known as Pavonia, in honor of Pauw. It would remain under Dutch control for nearly twenty years, when it was reconquered by Portugal.

In 1623 Pauw was knighted by the Republic of Venice in Order of Saint Mark supporting the city against the Philip III of Spain. He was lord of Achttienhoven, South Holland through his wife, and father of three children. In 1638 he commissioned Philips Vingboons, one of the most popular architects of the period, to build a canal house at Herengracht in a Palladian style. Clad in grey sandstone imported from Bentheim, Germany, it was the first in the city to have a neck gable.

References

1590 births
1640 deaths
Administrators of the Dutch West India Company
Dutch West India Company people from Amsterdam
People of New Netherland
17th-century Dutch politicians
History of Jersey City, New Jersey